Mount Kinsey is a mountain,  high, at the eastern edge of Beardmore Glacier, standing  southwest of Ranfurly Point in the Supporters Range, Antarctica. It was named by the British Antarctic Expedition, 1907–09, for J.J. Kinsey of Christchurch, who conducted the affairs of the expedition in New Zealand.

References

Mountains of the Ross Dependency
Dufek Coast